Dawidowski or Davidovsky is a surname with variants in multiple languages. In Poland, it is most frequent in the north.

People 
 Maciej Aleksy Dawidowski (1920-1943), Polish scoutmaster
 Tomasz Dawidowski (born 1978), Polish footballer
 Mario Davidovsky (1934-2019), Argentine composer

References 

Polish-language surnames